Bactra angulata is a moth of the family Tortricidae first described by Alexey Diakonoff in 1956. It is found in Borneo, Halmahera, the Palau Islands, southern New Guinea and Sri Lanka.

References

Moths of Asia
Moths described in 1956